The Doubles competition at the 2019 FIL European Luge Championships was held on 9 February 2019.

Results
The first run was held at 12:35 and the second run at 14:15.

References

Doubles